= Domain reduction algorithm =

Domain reduction algorithms are algorithms used to reduce constraints and degrees of freedom in order to provide solutions for partial differential equations.
